Everton da Silva Oliveira (born 10 March 1983), commonly known as Betão, is a Brazilian retired footballer who played as a midfielder.

Everton used to play for several Brazilian football clubs before he came to China in 2007. He joined Shanghai Stars at first, and then moved to Anhui Jiufang. In February 2010, Hubei Greenery, which would play in China League One, confirmed that Everton had signed a contract with the club.

References

External links
 CBF Contract Archive 

1983 births
Living people
Brazilian footballers
Brazilian expatriate footballers
Santos FC players
Nacional Atlético Clube (SP) players
Expatriate footballers in China
China League One players
Anhui Jiufang players
Wuhan F.C. players
Brazilian expatriate sportspeople in China
Pudong Zobon players
Association football midfielders
People from São Vicente, São Paulo
Footballers from São Paulo (state)